Michel Penha (December 14, 1888 – February 10, 1982) was a cellist. He played with the Philadelphia Orchestra from 1920 to 1925.

He was born in Amsterdam, Netherlands to Maurice Penha, He graduated from the Amsterdam Conservatoire in 1905. He studied music under Isaac Mossel and Hugo Becker. He migrated to New York City in 1909.

He never married. He died in Los Angeles, California, at age 93.

References

1888 births
1982 deaths
American cellists
Dutch cellists
Dutch emigrants to the United States
Conservatorium van Amsterdam alumni
Musicians from Amsterdam
Musicians of the Philadelphia Orchestra
20th-century cellists